The following is a list of episodes from the British television series Dempsey and Makepeace. It ran for three series between 11 January 1985 and 1 November 1986. A total of 30 episodes were produced. The series was devised by Tony Wharmby who also produced the first two series. The third was produced by Ranald Graham. The series was produced by LWT in a joint venture with Golden Eagle films and originally transmitted in the UK on ITV.

Episode list 
Regular cast: Michael Brandon as Lt. James Dempsey, Glynis Barber as Det. Sgt. Harriet Makepeace, Ray Smith as Chief Supt. Gordon Spikings, Tony Osoba as Det. Sgt. Chas Jarvis

References

External links
 Dempsey and Makepeace at IMDb.com

Dempsey and Makepeace episodes, List of
Dempsey and Makepeace episodes